Zhong Ni (born 20 May 1962) is a Chinese former professional tennis player who competed during the 1980s.

Zhong was a member of the China Federation Cup team between 1984 and 1987, appearing in a total of 11 ties. She amassed five wins in singles rubbers and won once in doubles.

At the 1986 Asian Games in Seoul, Zhong won a gold medal in the team competition and was a silver medalist for China in the mixed doubles.

ITF finals

Singles: 1 (0–1)

Doubles: 9 (3–6)

See also
List of China Fed Cup team representatives

References

External links
 
 
 

1962 births
Living people
Chinese female tennis players
Tennis players at the 1986 Asian Games
Asian Games medalists in tennis
Asian Games gold medalists for China
Asian Games silver medalists for China
Medalists at the 1986 Asian Games
20th-century Chinese women